Rewana is an extinct genus of prehistoric temnospondyls. Two species have been described from the Arcadia Formation of Australia.

See also 
 Prehistoric amphibian
 List of prehistoric amphibians

References 

Stereospondyls
Triassic amphibians
Induan life
Triassic temnospondyls of Australia
Fossil taxa described in 1972